is a centaur from the outer Solar System, approximately  in diameter. It was discovered by the Mount Lemmon Survey on 13 March 2005. The unusual minor planet follows an orbit similar to those of the fragments of comet Shoemaker–Levy 9. This minor planet was numbered  by the Minor Planet Center on 27 October 2021. , it has not yet been named.

Description 

 is classified as an unusual object and centaur. It was first observed by the Mount Lemmon Survey on 13 March 2005.

It orbits the Sun at a distance of 5.0–8.5 AU once every 17 years and 6 months (6,387 days; semi-major axis of 6.74 AU). Its orbit has an eccentricity of 0.26 and an inclination of 5° with respect to the ecliptic. The body's observation arc begins with its first observation by the Mount Lemmon Survey in March 2005.

Comet Shoemaker–Levy 9 

As of December 2017,  has an orbit similar to the average one of the fragments of comet Shoemaker–Levy 9 (semi-major axis:  , eccentricity: , inclination: , longitude of the ascending node:  and argument of perihelion).

References

External links 
  at AstDys-2
 List Of Centaurs and Scattered-Disk Objects, Minor Planet Center
 
 

606357
606357
606357
20171027